Aaron Pelch (born September 9, 1977) is an American college athletics administrator and former football coach. He is the athletic director at Millsaps College in Jackson, Mississippi, a position he held on an interim basis from December 2018 until being appointed on a permanent basis in January 2020. Pelch served as the head football coach at Millsaps for ten season, from 2010 to 2019, compiling a record of 49–50. In 2009, Pelch was a special teams assistant for the Oakland Raiders of the National Football League (NFL).

Head coaching record

References

External links
 Millsaps profile
 

1977 births
Living people
Millsaps Majors athletic directors
Millsaps Majors football coaches
New Mexico Highlands Cowboys football coaches
Oakland Raiders coaches
Weber State Wildcats football players
High school football coaches in California
People from Sandy, Utah
Players of American football from Utah